USCGC Bertholf (WMSL-750) is the first  maritime security cutter of the United States Coast Guard. She is named for Commodore Ellsworth P. Bertholf, fourth commandant of both the Revenue Cutter Service and Coast Guard.

In 2005, construction began at Northrop Grumman's Ship Systems Ingalls Shipyard in Pascagoula, Mississippi. She was launched on September 29, 2006, christened November 11, 2006, and commissioned on August 4, 2008. The cutter's home port is Alameda, California. Bertholf was the first to fire the Bofors 57 mm gun aboard a U.S. vessel on 11 February 2008.

Operational history
On March 3, 2016, Bertholf responded to a sighting off the Pacific Coast of Panama of a semi-submersible narco-submarine, reported by a P-3 Orion. The semi-submersible surrendered to a boarding party launched from Bertholf, and four suspects were captured along with 6 tons of cocaine.  The boarding party then sank the semi-submersible. During the 2012 RIMPAC exercises Bertholf detected and tracked missile threats and also provided naval gunfire support for troops ashore during the training exercise, demonstrating the capability of moving with other naval forces and being able to perform other defense operations.

On 25 March 2019, USS Curtis Wilbur (DDG-54), in concert with Bertholf transited the contested Taiwan Strait. On 15 April of same year, the ship visited Hong Kong, the first Coast Guard vessel to do so in seventeen years.

Legend-class cutter
Bertholf is the lead ship of the  design and the first large ship to be built under the Coast Guard's multi-year Deepwater acquisitions project. The NSCs are to replace the fleet's aging 1960s-era 378-foot s.

Features
Automated weapon systems
Medium-caliber deck gun (57 mm) capable of stopping rogue merchant vessels far from shore
Helicopter launch and recovery pad with rail-based aircraft retrieval system and two aircraft hangars
Stern launching ramp for small boat launch and recovery
Bow thruster
State-of-the-art C4ISR improving interoperability between Coast Guard and Department of Defense assets
Detection and defense capabilities against chemical, biological, or radiological attack
Advanced sensors for intelligence collection and sharing
Real-time tracking and seamless common operational picture/maritime domain awareness via integration with Rescue 21
Advanced state-of-the-art Ships Integrated Control System (machinery control, steering, navigation) for reduced manpower requirements and improved automation
Cassidian (EADS) TRS-3D/16-ES air search radar for area surveillance
The cutter can have an anti-terrorism/force protection suite that will include underwater sonar that will allow the cutter to scan ports, approaches, facilities and high-value assets for underwater mines and mine-like devices and detect swimmers.

Gallery

References

External links

Bertholf home page
Deepwater Official site about USCGS Bertholf
National Security Cutter Home
Team Deepwater NSC Home
Bertholf intercepting drug boats in her first action (video)

Legend-class cutters
Ships of the United States Coast Guard
2006 ships
Ships built in Pascagoula, Mississippi